The 6th Filmfare Awards were held in 10 May 1959, at Bombay, honoring the best films in Hindi Cinema for the year 1958.

Madhumati led the ceremony with 12 nominations, followed by Sadhna with 6 nominations.

Madhumati won 9 awards – a record at the time – including Best Film, Best Director (for Bimal Roy) and Best Supporting Actor (for Johnny Walker), thus becoming the most-awarded film at the ceremony.

The ceremony was also noted as Vyjayanthimala became the first actress to receive dual nominations for Best Actress for her performances in Madhumati and Sadhna, winning for the latter.

Main Awards

Technical Awards

Multiple Nominations & Wins

The following films received multiple awards and nominations.

See also
 7th Filmfare Awards
 5th Filmfare Awards
 Filmfare Awards

References

External links
 Winner and nomination of 6th Filmfare Awards at Internet Movie Database

Filmfare Awards
Filmfare
1959 in Indian cinema